Kevin Spiolek (born 5 May 1962 in Cambridge) is a retired English professional darts player who played during the 1980s and 1990s. He made a brief return to form in 2006, when qualifying to play in the PDC World Darts Championship.

Career
His best form came in the late 1980s, when he reached the semi-finals of the 1987 Winmau World Masters, losing to Bob Anderson. In 1988, Spiolek reached the final of the prestigious News of the World Darts Championship, losing to Mike Gregory. 

Spiolek is one of ten players to have beaten Phil Taylor at the World Championship – having knocked him out in the second round at Lakeside in the 1993 World Championship – the last time that there was a unified World Championship. Spiolek was eliminated in the next round – to date, two quarter-finals are the best results he has achieved in World Championships.

Spiolek was one of the 16 players in 1992–1993 who created their own organisation (the World Darts Council which later became the Professional Darts Corporation). In 1994, he reached the final of the Greene King Masters – losing to Taylor. Spiolek played in the first seven PDC World Championships after the split in the game with his best performance being another quarter-final in 1995. 

He reached the final of the North American Cup in 1996, and the quarter-finals of the World Matchplay in 1997, but then gradually faded from the scene. His performance in qualifying for the 2006 PDC World Championship (where he lost in the first round to Peter Manley) kept him in the top 100 of the PDC world rankings until January 2008. 

He had continued to play in the domestic Pro Tour events on the PDC circuit during 2005 and 2006 – playing in more than 10 events on the PDC Pro Tour, but he has remained inactive on the circuit since the Players Championship in Gibraltar in January 2007.

World Championship Results

BDO

1993: Quarter-finals (lost to John Lowe 3–4)

PDC

1994: Last 24 Group (beat Keith Deller 3–1) & (lost to Steve Brown (USA) 0–3)
1995: Quarter-finals (lost to Peter Evison 1–4)
1996: Last 24 Group (lost to Sean Downs 0–3) & (lost to Keith Deller 2–3)
1997: Last 24 Group (lost to Dennis Smith 0–3) & (lost to Keith Deller 0–3)
1998: Last 24 Group (lost to Phil Taylor 0–3) & (lost to Dennis Smith 0–3)
1999: 1st Round (lost to Steve Brown (USA) 0–3)
2000: 1st Round (lost to Jamie Harvey 2–3)
2006: 1st Round (lost to Peter Manley 0–3)

Career finals

Independent major finals: 1 (1 runner-up)

References

External links
Profile and stats on Darts Database

1962 births
English darts players
Living people
Sportspeople from Cambridge
English people of Polish descent
Professional Darts Corporation founding players
British Darts Organisation players